USS Heroic (AMc-84) was an Accentor-class coastal minesweeper acquired by the U.S. Navy for the dangerous task of removing mines from minefields laid in the water to prevent ships from passing.

Heroic, a wooden-hull coastal minesweeper, was laid down on 5 May and launched on 30 August 1941 by Warren Boat Yard, Inc., Warren, Rhode Island.

World War II service
Heroic reported to Mine Warfare School, Yorktown, Virginia, for intensive training 11 April 1942 and then proceeded to Bermuda for further training. She was assigned to patrol and minesweeping duty in the 5th Naval District and was based at Norfolk, Virginia, 20 July 1942 and served there throughout the remainder of the war.

Post-war decommissioning
Heroic decommissioned at Portsmouth, Virginia, 18 December 1945 and was turned over to the Maritime Commission for disposal 28 September 1946.

References

External links
 NavSource Online: Mine Warfare Vessel Photo Archive - Heroic (AMc 84)

 

Accentor-class minesweepers
World War II minesweepers of the United States
Ships built in Warren, Rhode Island
1941 ships